Aquilegia flabellata, common name  fan columbine or dwarf columbine, is a species of flowering perennial plant in the genus Aquilegia (columbine), of the family Ranunculaceae.

Description
It has slightly glaucous, divided leaves.

Distribution and habitat
This species is native to Eastern Asia – Japan and Korea.

Cultivation
This low-growing columbine is suitable for cultivation in an alpine garden or rockery. Numerous cultivars have been selected for garden use. The compact varieties A. flabellata var. pumila and A. flabellata var. pumila f. alba have gained the Royal Horticultural Society's Award of Garden Merit.

Varieties
Aquilegia flabellata 'Ministar'
Aquilegia flabellata 'Sapphire'
Aquilegia flabellata f. alba  

Aquilegia flabellata Jewel Series  
Aquilegia flabellata soft pink  
Aquilegia flabellata 'Cameo Pink' (Cameo Series)  
Aquilegia flabellata Cameo Series  
Aquilegia flabellata 'Cameo Blue' (Cameo Series)  
Aquilegia flabellata 'Cameo White' (Cameo Series)  
Aquilegia flabellata 'Cameo Blush' (Cameo Series)  
Aquilegia flabellata 'Blue Jewel' (Jewel Series)  
Aquilegia flabellata 'Pink Jewel' (Jewel Series)
Aquilegia flabellata 'Cameo Rose' (Cameo Series)  
Aquilegia flabellata nana yezoense  
Aquilegia flabellata 'Fantasy White' (Fantasy Series)  
Aquilegia flabellata 'Fantasy Pink' (Fantasy Series)  
Aquilegia flabellata 'Fantasy Purple' (Fantasy Series)  
Aquilegia flabellata 'Fantasy Blue' (Fantasy Series)  
Aquilegia flabellata 'Pink Topaz' (Jewel Series)  
Aquilegia flabellata double white 
Aquilegia flabellata 'Georgia' (State Series)  
Aquilegia flabellata var. pumila 'Snowflakes'
Aquilegia flabellata 'Fantasy Deep Purple' (Fantasy Series)  
Aquilegia flabellata 'Fantasy Light Salmon' (Fantasy Series)  
Aquilegia flabellata var. pumila 'Atlantis'  

Aquilegia flabellata Fantasy Series, mixed  
Aquilegia flabellata f. alba 'White Angel'  
Aquilegia flabellata 'Cameo Pink and White' (Cameo Series)  
Aquilegia flabellata 'Cameo Blue and White' (Cameo Series)  
Aquilegia flabellata 'Cameo Rose and White' (Cameo Series)
Aquilegia flabellata var. pumila 'Silver Edge' 
Aquilegia flabellata var. pumila 'Flore Pleno' 
Aquilegia flabellata from Rebun-to, Japan  
Aquilegia flabellata var. pumila f. konoi  
Aquilegia flabellata var. pumila f. kurilensis  
Aquilegia flabellata f. alba 'White Jewel' (Jewel Series)  
Aquilegia flabellata var. pumila f.  kurilensis 'Rosea'
Aquilegia flabellata var. pumila f. alba  
Aquilegia flabellata var. pumila from Mount Hakkoda, Japan

References

flabellata
Plants described in 1845